Events from the year 2012 in the Russia

Incumbents
 President of Russia – Dmitry Medvedev (United Russia) (until 7 May), Vladimir Putin (United Russia) (from 7 May)
 Prime Minister of Russia – Vladimir Putin (United Russia) (until 7 May), Viktor Zubkov (7-8 May, acting), Dmitry Medvedev (United Russia) (from 8 May)

Events

January 
 January 5 - Russia loses to Sweden 1-0 in overtime in the 2012 World Junior Ice Hockey Championship.
 January 9 - Insurgency in the North Caucasus: Clashes occur between the Russian forces and Islamist militants in the Vedensky District, Chechnya, with reportedly 8 killed and 16 wounded.
 January 15 - Russia's unmanned Fobos-Grunt space probe re-enters the Earth's atmosphere after a failed mission to the Martian moon Phobos. The 13-ton spacecraft disintegrates over the southern Pacific Ocean at approximately 16:45 UTC. China's first Mars probe, Yinghuo-1, which was launched together with Fobos-Grunt, is also destroyed.
 January 27 - Insurgency in the North Caucasus: 13 people are killed in three separate clashes between the Russian forces and Islamist militants in the Russian republics of Ingushetia, Dagestan, and Kabardino-Balkariya.

February 
 February 13–17 - 2012 Nozhay-Yurtovsky District clashes.

March 
 March 4 - The 2012 Presidential election is held.

May 
 May 7 - Putin was inaugurated as President
 May 8 - Medvedev appointed as Prime Minister and later he became leader of the United Russia Party
 May 21 - new cabinet was formed.

June 
 June 3–4 - The European Union-Russia Summit in Saint Petersburg.

July 
 July  - The Russian foreign agent law bill is introduced by legislators from the governing United Russia party.
 July 20  - The Russian foreign agent law is signed into law by President Vladimir Putin. The law requires non-profit organizations that receive foreign donations and engage in "political activity" to register and declare themselves as foreign agents
 Stavropol region has a ban on hijabs in schools. the first of its kind imposed by a region in the Russian federation. The ruling was upheld by Russia's Supreme Court in July 2013.

Notable deaths

January 

 January 2 - Anatoly Kolesov, 73, wrestler, Olympic gold medalist (1964), after long illness. (born 1938)
 January 2 - Ivan Călin, 76, Moldovan politician, Acting President of the Moldovan Parliament (2009).
 January 3 - Stepan Oshchepkov, 77, canoeist, Olympic gold medalist (1964). (born 1934)
 January 5 - Alexander Sizonenko, 52, Russian basketball player, world's tallest person (1991).
 January 8 - Dmitry Machinsky, 74, Russian archaeologist.
 January 9 - Pyotr Vasilevsky, 55, Belarusian football player and coach.
 January 14 - Zelemkhan Zangiyev, 37, Russian footballer.
 January 15 - Eduard Ivanov, 73, Soviet ice hockey player, World and Olympic champion.
 January 16 - Valentin Rusantsov, 72, Primate of the Russian Orthodox Autonomous Church (1996–2012).
 January 25 - Alexander Zhitinsky, 71, Russian writer.
 January 27 - Dzhamaleim Mutaliyev, 35, Russian rebel leader, shot.

February 

 February 6 - Vitaly Gorelik, 44, Russian mountaineer, heart attack.
 February 11 - Sergey Kolosov, 90, Russian film director, People's Artist of the USSR.
 February 17 - Tatyana Golikova, 66, Russian ballerina (Bolshoi Ballet).
 February 20 - 
 Asar Eppel, 77, Russian translator, stroke.
 Vitaly Vorotnikov, 86, Soviet politician, Chairman of the Presidium of the Supreme Soviet of the Russian SFSR (1988–1990).
 February 22 - Lyudmila Kasatkina, 86, Russian actress, People's Artist of the USSR.

March 

 March 21 - Marina Salye, Russian geologist and politician.
 March 27 - Anatoly Kikin, Soviet and Russian footballer and coach.
 March 27 - Alim Zankishiev, Russian insurgent, leader in the Caucasus Emirate.
 March 28 - Eduard Steinberg, 76, Russian painter.
 March 28 - Sergey Solnechnikov, Russian military officer.
 March 30 - Viktor Kosichkin, Russian Olympic speed skating gold and silver medalist.
 March 30 - Leonid Shebarshin, Russian KGB interim Chairman.

June 

 June 4 - Eduard Khil, 77, Russian baritone singer.

See also 
 List of Russian films of 2012

References

External links

 
Years of the 21st century in Russia
2010s in Russia